|}

The Dawn Run Mares' Novices' Hurdle, run as the Ryanair Mares' Novices' Hurdle for sponsorship purposes, is a Grade 2 National Hunt hurdle race in Great Britain which is open to fillies and mares aged four years or older. It is run on the New Course at Cheltenham over a distance of about 2 miles and 1 furlong (2 miles and 179 yards, or 3,382 metres), and during its running there are eight hurdles to be jumped. The race is for novice hurdlers, and it is scheduled to take place each year during the Cheltenham Festival in March.

The race was first run in 2016 as a new race at the Cheltenham Festival, expanding the meeting to 28 races. The race was sponsored by Trull House Stud and run as the Trull House Stud Mares' Novices' Hurdle from 2016 to 2018. In 2019 the race was sponsored by Tattersalls in conjunction with a group of National Hunt breeders including Trull House Stud before Daylesford took over as sponsor for the 2020 running. The 2021 race was sponsored by Parnell Properties and Ryanair took over the sponsorship from the 2022 running.

Records
Leading jockey (2 wins):
Ruby Walsh - Limini (2016), Let's Dance (2017)

Leading trainer (5 wins):
Willie Mullins - Limini (2016), Let's Dance (2017), Laurina (2018), Eglantine du Seuil (2019), Concertista (2020)

Winners

See also
 Horse racing in Great Britain
 List of British National Hunt races

References

 Racing Post:

National Hunt races in Great Britain
Cheltenham Racecourse
National Hunt hurdle races
Recurring sporting events established in 2016
2016 establishments in England